West Woods Methodist Episcopal Church is a historic Methodist Episcopal church located at Gumboro, Sussex County, Delaware.  It was built in 1891, and is in the Gothic Revival style.

It was added to the National Register of Historic Places in 2007.

References

Methodist churches in Delaware
Churches on the National Register of Historic Places in Delaware
Carpenter Gothic church buildings in Delaware
Churches completed in 1891
19th-century Methodist church buildings in the United States
Churches in Sussex County, Delaware
National Register of Historic Places in Sussex County, Delaware